Sofiat Arinola Obanishola (born 16 September 2003) is a Nigerian badminton player. She has participated in major badminton events at both local and international level. In the junior event, she won a silver in the mixed doubles, and two bronze medals in the girls' doubles and team events at the 2018 Algiers African Youth Games. Obanishola then participated at the 2019 Rabat African Games held in Casablanca, Morocco, and helps the Nigerian team clinched the gold medal, also won a bronze medal in the women's singles event.

Achievements

African Games 
Women's singles

African Youth Games 
Girls' doubles

Mixed doubles

References

External links 
 

2003 births
Living people
Nigerian female badminton players
Competitors at the 2019 African Games
African Games gold medalists for Nigeria
African Games bronze medalists for Nigeria
African Games medalists in badminton
Yoruba sportswomen